Tandel is a commune and village in eastern Luxembourg, in the canton of Vianden. It lies close to the border with Germany. , the village of Tandel, which lies in the centre of the commune, has a population of 87.

The commune of Tandel was formed on 1 January 2006 from the former communes of Bastendorf (in the canton of Diekirch) and Fouhren (in the canton of Vianden).  The law creating Tandel was passed on 21 December 2004.

Populated places
The commune consists of the following villages:

 Bastendorf Section:
 Bastendorf
 Brandenbourg
 Landscheid
 Tandel
 Hoscheidterhof
 Këppenhaff
 Fischbacherhof (lieu-dit)
 Froehnerhof (lieu-dit)
 Ronnenbusch (lieu-dit)

 Fouhren Section:
 Bettel
 Fouhren
 Longsdorf
 Walsdorf
 Seltz
 Bleesbréck (lieu-dit)
 Marxberg (lieu-dit)
 Schmëttenhaff (lieu-dit)

Population

References

External links
 

 
Communes in Vianden (canton)
Villages in Luxembourg